Pobrđe Milodraž  is a village in the municipality of Kiseljak, Bosnia and Herzegovina.

Demographics 
According to the 2013 census, its population was 148, all Bosniaks.

See also 
Milodraž, medieval settlement

References

Populated places in Kiseljak